Bearden Elementary School may refer to:
 R. H. Bearden Elementary School - Tallahatchie County, Mississippi - West Tallahatchie School District
 Bearden Elementary School - Bearden, Arkansas - Bearden School District
 Bearden Public School - Okemah, Oklahoma